The Nanaimo River climbing area is located near the city of Nanaimo, adjacent to the Nanaimo River. The rock is mainly sandstone and conglomerate. The crag is Sunny Side. This is aptly named as Sunny Side is located on the north side of the river. During the summer the water warms up to around 24-25°C (75-77°F), so the river is visited by swimmers, kayakers and fishermen.

History
Bolted routes started being set during the late eighties / early nineties. Nanaimo River is not, and has never been, a developed or maintained park.

Sunny Side

Getting there
Driving north past the Nanaimo Airport, take the first right off the #1 highway onto Nanaimo River Road. This road will pass under the highway, and cross over railroad tracks. Continue until major power lines pass over head. This is where you park. Walk under the power lines to the south. The trail will fork into three: the first right will take you to the top of the cliffs, the second right will take you down some steps to the bottom of the cliffs, and the final path continues to the left and takes you to the swimming area.

Climbs
There are several cliff faces on the Sunny Side. The First Cliffs are literally the first set of cliffs you pass when approaching from the stairs. The Upper Deck is the higher portion of the cliffs that can either be approached from the top via the first path turning off. The  Lower Deck is directly underneath the Upper Deck, and can either be approached by a rappel, or by scrambling over rocks from an approach path between the first cliffs, and the Upper Deck.

First Cliffs

Upper Deck

Lower Deck

References

Geography of Vancouver Island